The 2006 Lakeside World Professional Darts Championship was held from 7 to 15 January 2006 at the Lakeside Country Club in Frimley Green, Surrey. Defending champion Raymond van Barneveld was aiming to win a fifth BDO world title, equalling the record set by Eric Bristow. However, he was beaten 7–5 in the final by Dutch qualifier Jelle Klaasen; the final was the first and only World Darts Championship final to not feature a British player. Klaasen became the youngest World Champion at age 21 and became the first qualifier to win the World Championship since Keith Deller in 1983, who became the youngest World Champion himself, aged 23. This would eventually be Van Barneveld's last appearance at the Lakeside as he would switch to the rival Professional Darts Corporation the next month.

Seeds
Men
  Mervyn King
  Martin Adams
  Raymond van Barneveld
  Simon Whitlock
  Tony Eccles
  Tony O'Shea
  John Walton
  Ted Hankey

Changes 
The 2006 championship was the last to be staged under the eight seeds format. For the 2007 event the number of seeded players for the men's championship was increased to 16. 2006 would also see a new format for the tournament with second round matches extended to the best of seven sets, as had been requested by numerous players down the years. The semi-finals were also extended to best of 11 sets and the final a best of 13 set affair.

Prize money
The prize money was £209,000 for the men's event and £11,000 for the women's event.

Men's Champion: £60,000
Runner-Up: £25,000
Semi-Finalists (2): £11,000
Quarter-Finalists (4): £6,000
Last 16 (8): £4,250
Last 32 (16): £2,750

There was also a shared 9 Dart Checkout prize of £52,000, along with a High Checkout prize of £2,000 per event.
Source:

Results

Men's

 Match distances in sets are quoted in brackets at the top of each round. All sets best of five legs, unless there is a final set tie-break.

The 2006 Lakeside Woman World Professional Darts Championship

In the women's tournament, Trina Gulliver continued her domination of the women's game by winning her sixth successive title, defeating Francis Hoenselaar 2–0. It was the third successive year that Gulliver and Hoenselaar had met in the final and the fourth time in five years.

Seeds

Women
  Trina Gulliver
  Francis Hoenselaar
  Karin Krappen
  Claire Bywaters

Prize money
£11,000 for the women's event.

Women's Champion: £6,000
Runner-Up: £2,000
Semi-Finalists (2): £1,000
Quarter-Finalists (4): £500

Women

References

External links
 2006 Lakeside World Championship tournament brochure

BDO World Darts Championships
BDO World Darts Championship
BDO World Darts Championships
BDO World Darts Championships
Sport in Surrey
Frimley Green